Sofiane Zermani (born 21 July 1986) is a French rapper. He is also known as Fianso (verlan of his first name). Born in Saint-Denis, Paris Region, he lived in the nearby Stains until age 13 when he moved to Le Blanc-Mesnil.

In 2011, he released independently the album Blacklist followed by Blacklist II in 2013. In 2016, he launched a series of videos titled #JeSuisPasséChezSo inviting other less-known rappers to take part. In November 2016, he was signed to Capitol Records, an affiliate of Universal Music France. In January 2017, he released "Ma cité a craqué" featuring Bakyl. The album #JeSuisPasséChezSo, same title as the earlier series has peaked at #2 on SNEP, the French Albums Chart. The album is certified Platinum in May 2017 for selling over 100,000 copies internationally.

In May 2017 Sofiane released the album Bandit saleté ("Filth bandit"), which again was certified platinum. For the music video for the song "Toka" from the album, Sofiane and around 10 of his crew stood in the middle of the A3 autoroute, blocking cars, while Sofiane rapped the song in front of cameras. The filming was done without a permit. In February 2018 he was fined €1,500 and given a suspended sentence of four months in jail for obstructing traffic. At the sentencing, Sofiane apologized for his actions, and said that the decision to film there had come to him in a moment of "bad inspiration".

Discography

Albums

Mixtapes and EPs

Collective albums

Singles

*Did not appear in the official Belgian Ultratop 50 charts, but rather in the bubbling under Ultratip charts.

Featured in

*Did not appear in the official Belgian Ultratop 50 charts, but rather in the bubbling under Ultratip charts.

Other charted songs

*Did not appear in the official Belgian Ultratop 50 charts, but rather in the bubbling under Ultratip charts.

Filmography
2014: Terremère by Aliou Sow 
2018: Frères Ennemis (English title Close Enemies) by David Oelhoffen
2018: Mauvaises herbes (English title Bad Seeds) by Kheiron
2019: Les Sauvages (TV series) (English title Savages by Sabri Louatah and Rebecca Zlotowski

Theatre
2018: Le Magnifique, adaptation of The Great Gatsby of F. Scott Fitzgerald, at Festival d'Avignon
2019: La Mort d'Achille, by Wajdi Mouawad, at Festival d'Avignon

Videography
2011: En ouvrant les bras
2012: Aller retour
2012: Elle était belle
2013: Échec et Mat
2013: So
2013: Ciao bonne vie (feat. Léa Castel)
2016: Rapass
2016: #JeSuisPasséChezSo (video series)
2017: Ma cité a craqué (feat. Bakyl)
2017: Tout l'monde s'en fout
2017: Bakhaw (feat. Boozoo)
2017: Toka
2017: Mon ptit loup
2017: Bandit saleté
2017: Pégase
2017: Le cercle (feat. Hornet La Frappe, GLK & YL)
2017: Bois d'argent
2017: Parti de rien
2020: American Airlines Ft. SCH
2021: Nouveaux Parrains Ft. Soolking

References

Living people
French rappers
1986 births
Rappers from Seine-Saint-Denis
People from Le Blanc-Mesnil
French people of Algerian descent